Willi Hoffmann (born 23 March 1948) is a retired German football player. He spent three seasons in the Bundesliga with FC Bayern Munich.
After his time in  Munich he spent several years with second division side Augsburg before returning to his hometown Göppingen.

Honours
 European Cup winner: 1973–74
 Bundesliga champion: 1971–72, 1972–73, 1973–74

References

External links
 

1948 births
Living people
German footballers
SSV Ulm 1846 players
FC Bayern Munich footballers
FC Augsburg players
Bundesliga players
2. Bundesliga players
Association football forwards